This is the discography for American rock band Grace Potter and the Nocturnals.

Studio albums

Live albums

Singles

Other songs
 Almost Alice (2010) "White Rabbit" (Jefferson Airplane cover)
 Tangled (2010) "Something That I Want"
 ZZ Top: A Tribute from Friends (2011) "Tush"
 A Big Day at the Fair (2017) "All You Need Is Love" (The Beatles cover)
 The Lone Ranger: Wanted (2013) - "Devil's Train"

Music videos

References 

Discographies of American artists
Rock music discographies